The Big Country is a 1958 American epic Western film directed by William Wyler, starring Gregory Peck, Jean Simmons, Carroll Baker, Charlton Heston, and Burl Ives. The supporting cast features Charles Bickford and Chuck Connors. Filmed in Technicolor and Technirama, the picture was based on the serialized magazine novel Ambush at Blanco Canyon by Donald Hamilton and was co-produced by Wyler and Peck. The opening title sequence was created by Saul Bass.

Burl Ives won the Academy Award as Best Supporting Actor for his performance, as well as the Golden Globe Award. The film was also nominated for an Academy Award for the musical score, composed by Jerome Moross. The film is one of the few in which Heston plays a major supporting role rather than the lead.

Plot
Former sea captain James McKay travels to the American West to join his fiancée Patricia at the enormous ranch owned by her father, Henry Terrill, referred to by all as "The Major". After a meeting with Patricia's friend, schoolteacher Julie Maragon, McKay and Patricia are accosted by a group of drunks led by Buck Hannassey, the son of the Major's ardent and implacable enemy Rufus Hannassey. In spite of the harassment and mockery, McKay surprises Patricia by making light of the incident and stating that he's experienced worse and the boys meant no harm.

The next morning, McKay declines an invitation from the Major's foreman Steve Leech to ride an indomitable bronco stallion named "Old Thunder". McKay then brings a pair of dueling pistols to the Major as a gift. When the Major learns of Buck's pestering of his daughter and future son-in-law, he gathers his men and goes to raid the Hannassey ranch despite McKay's attempts to defuse the situation. The Major's group finds neither Rufus nor Buck, so they settle for terrorizing the Hannassey women and children, shooting holes in the Hannassey water reservoir. They find Buck's posse in town and proceed to beat and humiliate them. Meanwhile, McKay privately tames and rides Old Thunder after many unsuccessful attempts, and swears his only witness, the ranch hand Ramon, to secrecy.

A gala is held on the Terrill ranch in honor of Patricia's upcoming wedding. At the height of the festivities, an armed Rufus crashes the party and accuses the Major of the hypocrisy of pretending to be a gentleman when his actions speak otherwise. The next day, McKay secretly goes to Maragon's abandoned ranch, known as the "Big Muddy". The Big Muddy's territory is the location of the town's only nearby river, and as such it is a vital source of water for both the Terrill and Hannassey cattle during times of drought. McKay persuades Maragon to sell the ranch to him in the hopes of both securing a gift for Patricia and ending the conflict by continuing Maragon's policy of unrestricted access to the river. McKay shows up at the camp of the search party led by Leech sent out to find the presumed lost McKay.

Upon returning to Ladder Ranch, Leech calls McKay a liar when McKay explains he was never lost or in danger, but McKay again refuses to be goaded into a fight, which disappoints Patricia enough to make the pair reconsider their engagement. Before dawn and without an audience, McKay challenges Leech to a prolonged outdoor fistfight, which ends in a draw. In the morning, Maragon tells Patricia of McKay's purchase of the Big Muddy for her, which initially convinces her to attempt to make amends with McKay. However, when she learns of McKay's plan to allow the Hannasseys equal access to the water, she leaves for good.

Wanting to lure the Major into an ambush in the canyon leading to his homestead, Rufus takes Maragon hostage. Although McKay personally promises Rufus equal access to the water, he finds himself in a clash with Buck, which is ultimately settled with a duel. Buck fires before the signal, but misses, his bullet grazing McKay's forehead and leaving him open to be shot by McKay. Buck's subsequent display of cowardice convinces McKay to spare Buck. The frustrated Buck snatches another gun from a nearby civilian, forcing Rufus to kill his son. Rufus goes to the canyon for a final confrontation with the Major and challenges him to a one-on-one showdown. Armed with rifles, the two old men advance and kill one another. McKay, along with Julie and Ramon, ride off to start a new life together.

Cast
 Gregory Peck as James McKay
 Jean Simmons as Julie Maragon
 Carroll Baker as Patricia Terrill
 Charlton Heston as Steve Leech
 Burl Ives as Rufus Hannassey
 Charles Bickford as Maj. Henry Terrill
 Alfonso Bedoya as Ramón Gutierrez
 Chuck Connors as Buck Hannassey
 Chuck Hayward as Rafe Hannassey
 Buff Brady as Dude Hannassey
 Jim Burk as Blackie / Cracker Hannassey
 Dorothy Adams as Hannassey Woman
 Chuck Roberson as Terrill Cowboy

Production

Robert Wyler and Jessamyn West wrote the first screenplay for the film based on the Donald Hamilton story that had been serialized in The Saturday Evening Post. Leon Uris wrote a second screenplay and Robert Wilder wrote another, with the final script by James R. Webb and Sy Bartlett. After arbitration, Webb, Bartlett and Wilder received screenplay credit and Wyler and West received adaptation credit. Uris was not given credit as his script deviated too much from the original story.

Director William Wyler was known for shooting an exorbitant number of takes on his films, usually without explaining to the actors what to do differently except "[make it] better", and this one was no exception. Many of the actors, including Jean Simmons and Carroll Baker, were so traumatized by his directing style that they refused to speak about the experience for years. Simmons later said they constantly received rewrites for the script, making acting extremely difficult. Gregory Peck and Wyler, who were good friends, fought constantly on the set and had a falling out for three years, although they later reconciled. Wyler and Charles Bickford also clashed, as they had done 30 years previously on the production of his 1929 film Hell's Heroes. Burl Ives, however, claimed to have enjoyed making the film.

Before principal photography was complete, Wyler left for Rome to start work on Ben-Hur, delegating creation of the final scenes involving McKay and Julie to his assistant Robert Swink, whose resulting scenes pleased Wyler so much that he wrote Swink a letter stating: "I can't begin to tell you how pleased I am with the new ending... The shots you made are complete perfection."

Locations
The Blanco Canyon scenes were filmed in California's Red Rock Canyon State Park in the Mojave Desert. The ranch and field scenes with greenery were filmed in the Sierra Nevada foothills near the town of Farmington in central California.

Reception
Bosley Crowther of The New York Times wrote in a negative review, "for all this film's mighty pretensions, it does not get far beneath the skin of its conventional Western situation and its stock Western characters. It skims across standard complications and ends on a platitude. Peace is a pious precept, but fightin' is more excitin'. That's what it proves." Variety called the film "one of the best photography jobs of the year", with a "serviceable, adult" storyline "which should find favor with audiences of all tastes." Harrison's Reports declared it "a first-rate super-Western, beautifully photographed in the Technirama anamorphic process and Technicolor. It is a long picture, perhaps too long for what the story has to offer, but there is never a dull moment from start to finish and it holds one's interest tightly throughout." Richard L. Coe of The Washington Post called it "super stuff. Franz Planer's photography of Texas is downright awe-inspiring, the characters are solid, the story line firm, the playing first-rate, the music more than dashing in this nearly three-hour tale which should delight everybody."

John McCarten of The New Yorker wrote, "Of those involved in this massive enterprise, Mr. Bickford and Mr. Ives are the most commendable as they whoop and snort about the sagebrush. But even they are hardly credible types, and as for the rest of the cast, they can be set down as a rather wooden lot." Philip K. Scheuer of the Los Angeles Times called the film "too self consciously 'epical' to be called great, but at its best, which is frequently, it's better than good." The Monthly Film Bulletin wrote that the picture's attempts to convey a message were for the most part "superficial and pedestrian," and found that "the pivotal character of McKay, played on a monotonously self-righteous note by Gregory Peck, never comes alive. It is mainly due to the power of the climactic canyon battle, and Burl Ives' interesting playing as Rufus, that this remains a not unsympathetic film, decorated pleasantly by Jean Simmons and with spirit by Carroll Baker."

The film was a big hit, being the second-most popular movie in Britain in 1959. On review aggregation website Rotten Tomatoes, the film has an approval rating of 100% based on 12 reviews, with an average rating of 7.4/10.

President Dwight D. Eisenhower liked the movie so much, he screened it on four successive evenings in the White House during his second administration.

Playmobil designed an entire cowboy line based on the architecture of the film.

In a poll of 500 films held by Empire, it was voted 187th-greatest movie of all time.

Accolades
Ives won the Academy Award as Best Supporting Actor, as well as a Golden Globe Award. The film was also nominated for an Academy Award for the musical score by Jerome Moross.

Preservation
The Academy Film Archive preserved The Big Country in 2006.

Comic book

A comic-book adaptation of the novel and tie-in to the movie was first released in 1957.

See also
 List of American films of 1958

References

External links
 
 
 
 

1958 films
1958 Western (genre) films
1950s American films
1950s English-language films
American Western (genre) epic films
Films adapted into comics
Films based on American novels
Films based on Western (genre) novels
Films directed by William Wyler
Films featuring a Best Supporting Actor Academy Award-winning performance
Films featuring a Best Supporting Actor Golden Globe winning performance
Films about feuds
Films scored by Jerome Moross
Films shot in California
Films shot in the Mojave Desert
United Artists films